Jonathan Peel, PC (12 October 1799 – 13 February 1879) was a British soldier, Conservative politician and racehorse owner.

Background and education
Peel was the fifth son of Sir Robert Peel, 1st Baronet, and his first wife Ellen (née Yates), and the younger brother of Prime Minister Sir Robert Peel, 2nd Baronet. He was educated at Rugby.

Military career

Peel was commissioned into the Rifle Brigade as a 2nd Lieutenant in June 1815. His later steady rise through the ranks was obtained by purchase. Peel served as a lieutenant in the 71st Highlanders from 1819 to 1821 and in the Grenadier Guards from 1822 to 1825, as a Major in the 69th Foot from 1826 to 1827, as a Lieutenant-Colonel in the 53rd Foot in 1827, when he was placed on half-pay. He was promoted to brevet Colonel in 1841, to Major-General in 1854 and to Lieutenant-General in 1859.

Political career

Peel's political career started when he was elected Member of Parliament for Norwich in 1826. He lost this seat in 1830 but returned to Parliament the following year as one of two representatives for Huntingdon, a seat he held until 1868.

He served under his brother as Surveyor-General of the Ordnance from 1841 to 1846 and was Secretary of State for War (with a seat in the cabinet) under the Earl of Derby between 1858 and 1859 and 1866 and 1867. In the latter office he was considered competent and successful and became very popular. However, he resigned in March 1867 in protest against the proposed electoral reforms. He had been admitted to the Privy Council in 1858.

Racing
Apart from his military and political career Peel was also an owner of racehorses, and in 1844 his horse Orlando won the Derby, after another horse, Running Rein, had been disqualified.

Personal life

Peel married, on 19 March 1824, Lady Alice Jane, youngest daughter of Archibald Kennedy, first Marquis of Ailsa, by whom he had eight children, five sons and three daughters. Their second son, Edmund Yates Peel, became a Lieutenant-Colonel in the Army. Their fourth son, John Peel, achieved the rank of Lieutenant-General in the Army. Their second daughter Alice married the diplomat Sir Robert Morier. Their youngest daughter, Adelaide Georgiana, married Michael Biddulph, 1st Baron Biddulph.

Death
He died on 13 February 1879, aged 79, at his home, Marble Hill House, Twickenham, Middlesex, and was buried in Twickenham new cemetery on 19 February. His widow died in 1887.

See also
Earl Peel

References

Sources

External links 
 

1799 births
1879 deaths
British Army generals
British racehorse owners and breeders
Conservative Party (UK) MPs for English constituencies
Members of the Privy Council of the United Kingdom
UK MPs 1826–1830
UK MPs 1831–1832
UK MPs 1832–1835
UK MPs 1835–1837
UK MPs 1837–1841
UK MPs 1841–1847
UK MPs 1847–1852
UK MPs 1852–1857
UK MPs 1857–1859
UK MPs 1859–1865
UK MPs 1865–1868
People educated at Rugby School
Rifle Brigade officers
Grenadier Guards officers
69th Regiment of Foot officers
Highland Light Infantry officers
King's Shropshire Light Infantry officers
Owners of Epsom Derby winners
Younger sons of baronets
Tory MPs (pre-1834)
Jonathan
Place of birth missing